Anna Ivanova may refer to:

 Anna Ivanova (volleyball, born 1978), Bulgarian volleyball player
 Anna Ivanova (volleyball, born 1987), Russian volleyball player
 Anna Ivanova (gymnast) (born 1988), Russian trampolinist